Scrobipalpa minimella is a moth in the family Gelechiidae. It was described by Povolný in 1968. It is found in Afghanistan.

The larvae feed on Cаrоxylоn оrientаle.

Taxonomy
The species name minimella is preoccupied by Scrobipalpa minimella, described by Turati in 1929.

References

Scrobipalpa
Moths described in 1968